April Ryan is a fictional character from the adventure game The Longest Journey (1999) and its sequel Dreamfall: The Longest Journey (2006). In the former, she is the protagonist, and in the latter, one of the three primary characters. April has been praised as one of the most memorable female characters in the history of adventure games. In both games she is voiced by American actress Sarah Hamilton.

Character design
The Longest Journey writer Ragnar Tørnquist compared April in TLJ to "young inexperienced" Frodo Baggins, whereas in Dreamfall she developed into an "Aragorn type character". Journalist Randy Sluganski described her adventure in TLJ as "a rite of passage; a maturation from the indecisive, self-deprecating teenage years into a hesitant adulthood that is at first shunned and then gradually embraced". One of the traits that helped the player to identify and empathize with April Ryan—a much praised concept—was that she kept a diary. Unlike the diary of Zoë Castillo, Dreamfall'''s protagonist, April's diary contains more self-revelations and allows much deeper insight in its owner's character and background, allowing the player to trace her personal development.

Tørnquist stated that he did not create April as a female protagonist to reach the female adventure gaming audience, but because a female lead was a better fit to a story where progress is as much about empathy and helping people out. Tørnquist, with his co-writer of Dreamfall Dag Sheve, commented that in terms of losing faith (a recurring theme in the game), April went further than the other two primary characters, resulting in her "actual death". Tørnquist, however, stressed the ambiguity of the term "actual death", refused to explicitly confirm her status, and added that "her influence is not fully played out. It is her story, all the way through".

Fictional biography
April Ryan is a human daughter of the White of the Draic Kin (Dragons), the Mother. It is unknown who her father is, or even if she has one. She is a painter and artist in the world of Stark. Whether April was born in Arcadia or Stark is not known; but shortly after her birth on April 14, 2191 by Stark reckoning, she was adopted into a normal human family that lived somewhere in the continental United States. Her adoptive father was often inebriated and beat her as a child. His antipathy is later revealed to stem from the fact that he dropped April on the floor when she was very little, which severely injured her legs, with doctors doubting that she ever would be able to walk. To suppress his guilt, he started ignoring her henceforth; but as she made a completely unexpected and quick recovery, he felt that she was mocking him and began to blame her for his own misery. Despite April's bad relationship with her father, she has always been on good terms with her adoptive mother and rarely had quarrels with her two brothers, Danny and Owen. After turning 18 April left her adoptive family forever, after having one last row with her father, wherein he was injured. Without a word of goodbye to her mother, April left for Newport, an industrial megapolis.

At the beginning of The Longest Journey, as a resident of the technology-driven world, Stark, she discovers that she is a Shifter - a person with the power to move between worlds. Her journey begins when she unwittingly transports herself to the magical Arcadia. She is the daughter of the White Dragon, as she herself felt a connection between the two of them and it is confirmed by the White Dragon. Moreover, her Stark parents adopted her. April is prophesied from all four species holding the parts of the disc as being the savior who will restore the balance, only to finally break it.

April (described on the promotional posters with a tagline "Rebel, Emissary, Chosen") returns in Dreamfall one of the three protagonists the game. After her success in The Longest Journey, she was left without a purpose, and chose to join the effort to liberate the Northlands from the occupation by the Azadi Empire. She has turned her back on her former world of Stark and considers herself a citizen of Arcadia now.

Reception

April Ryan (sometimes, along with her Dreamfall counterpart Zoë Castillo) is considered one of the most memorable characters in the history of adventure games. Although she is represented with strongly feminine attributes, she is also part of a trend of strong, beautiful women in a variety of media that do not depend on men to achieve heroic deeds. She has been compared to Tomb Raider'' protagonist Lara Croft in that respect; April shows less prominent physical feminine attributes than Lara, but more feminine psychological traits as contrasted with Lara's masculine connotations like aggressiveness and force. Hamilton's performance has been praised as "superb" and capturing the "inflection nuances that allow us to believe in April's growth as a woman".

In 2000, Eurogamer nominated April for the annual Gaming Globes awards in the category Female Lead Character. She was included on the list of 50 greatest female video characters by Tom's Games in 2007, as well as ranked 61st on the list of best heroes in entertainment by UGO.com in 2010 and as the 45th greatest heroine in video game history by Complex.com in 2013. In 2012, she was also listed as the fifth sexiest "video game girl" by Revision3.

References

Adventure game characters
Female characters in video games
Fictional artists in video games
Science fantasy video game characters
The Longest Journey
Video game characters introduced in 1999
Woman soldier and warrior characters in video games